Avesnes is the name of several villages and towns in France:

 Avesnes, département Pas-de-Calais
 Avesnes (Somme), département Somme, former municipality, now part of Vron.
 Avesnes-Chaussoy, département Somme
 Avesnes-en-Bray, département Seine-Maritime
 Avesnes-en-Saosnois, département Sarthe
 Avesnes-en-Val, département Seine-Maritime
 Avesnes-le-Comte, département Pas-de-Calais
 Avesnes-les-Aubert, département Nord
 Avesnes-lès-Bapaume, département Pas-de-Calais
 Avesnes-le-Sec, département Nord
 Avesnes-sur-Helpe, département Nord, historic city, giving its name to:
 House of Avesnes, a medieval family
 Arrondissement of Avesnes-sur-Helpe